Sigaus villosus is New Zealand's largest grasshopper. It is only found in the central mountains of the South Island. The genus Sigaus is endemic to the New Zealand. Like all of New Zealand sub-alpine and alpine grasshoppers S. villosus has a 2 or 3 years life cycle. The eggs must ‘overwinter’ before they will hatch. Hoppers are found throughout the year and adult grasshoppers can be found throughout the New Zealand summer between December and April.  Adult S. villosus do not overwinter.

Distribution and habitat
 
Sigaus villosus is known from the central mountains of the South Island, with the largest population on the Craigieburn Range. It can be found as far south as the Fox Peak and as far north as the Mount Wilson. Adult grasshoppers are found during the New Zealand summer between October and March.

Species description
This species was first described by J. T. Salmon in 1950 and originally named Brachaspis villosa. The wings on S. villosus are micropterous (small wings) between  making this species flightless like most of New Zealand grasshoppers.

Polymorphism
Only one colour morph are known for adults S. villosus, 'Grey'. All specimens are light grey with black coloured eyes.

Type information

Salmon, J.T. 1950: A new species of Acrididae (Insecta: Orthoptera) from New Zealand. Transactions of the Royal Society of New Zealand, Vol. 78, Part 1, page 69, February 1950
Type locality: Mount Torlesse, Canterbury. 
Type specimen: Immature female; J. T. Salmon; Holotype, Paratype and Allotype are deposited in the Museum of New Zealand Te Papa Tongarewa. Plesiotype are deposited in the Canterbury Museum, Christchurch.

References

Acrididae of New Zealand
Endemic fauna of New Zealand
Insects described in 1950
Acrididae
Endemic insects of New Zealand